Streptomyces lichenis is a bacterium species from the genus of Streptomyces which has been isolated from lichen from the Chiang Rai Province in Thailand.

See also 
 List of Streptomyces species

References 

lichenis
Bacteria described in 2018